HMS Sedgemoor was a 50-gun fourth rate ship of the line of the English Royal Navy, launched at Chatham Dockyard in 1687.

Sedgemoor was driven ashore and wrecked at South Foreland, Kent on 2 January 1689.

Notes

References

Lavery, Brian (2003) The Ship of the Line - Volume 1: The development of the battlefleet 1650-1850. Conway Maritime Press. .

Ships of the line of the Royal Navy
1680s ships
Maritime incidents in 1689